Turris cleopatrae is an extinct species of sea snail, a marine gastropod mollusk in the family Turridae, the turrids.

Description
Measurements of the shell: 10.0 x 4.0 mm.

Distribution
This extinct marine species was found in Eocene strata in Egypt (40.4 to 37.2 Ma).

References

 H. L. Abbass. 1967. A monograph on the Egyptian Paleocene and Eocene gastropods. United Arab Republic, Geological Survey-Geological Museum, Palaeontological Series, Monograph (4)1-154

cleopatrae
Gastropods described in 1967